Silverio José Ortiz Ley (born 18 December 1982) is a Mexican professional boxer. Silverio is the current IBA light welterweight Champion.

Professional career
In April 2005, Ortiz beat an undefeated Ricardo Dominguez at the Dodge Arena in Hidalgo, Texas.

On May 1, 2010 Ortiz beat title contender Fernando Angulo to win the IBA light welterweight title.

Professional boxing record

|- style="margin:0.5em auto; font-size:95%;"
|align="center" colspan=8|26 Wins (12 knockouts, 14 decisions), 13 Losses (4 knockouts, 9 decisions), 0 Draws|- style="margin:0.5em auto; font-size:95%;"
|align=center style="border-style: none none solid solid; background: #e3e3e3"|Res.|align=center style="border-style: none none solid solid; background: #e3e3e3"|Record|align=center style="border-style: none none solid solid; background: #e3e3e3"|Opponent|align=center style="border-style: none none solid solid; background: #e3e3e3"|Type|align=center style="border-style: none none solid solid; background: #e3e3e3"|Rd., Time|align=center style="border-style: none none solid solid; background: #e3e3e3"|Date|align=center style="border-style: none none solid solid; background: #e3e3e3"|Location|align=center style="border-style: none none solid solid; background: #e3e3e3"|Notes'''
|-align=center
|-align=center
|Win|| 26-13-0 ||align=left| Oscar Tinajero
||| 7 ||   || align=left|  
|align=left|
|-align=center
|Win|| 25-13-0 ||align=left| Mahonri Montes
||| 8 ||   || align=left|  
|align=left|
|-align=center
|Win|| 24-13-0 ||align=left| Cristian Favela
||| 10 ||   || align=left|  
|align=left|
|-align=center
|Win|| 23-13-0 ||align=left| Efren Hinojosa
||| 2,1:56 ||   || align=left|  
|align=left|
|-align=center
|Win|| 22-13-0 ||align=left| Elvin Perez
||| 2,1:17 ||   || align=left|  
|align=left|
|-align=center
|Win|| 21-13-0 ||align=left| Fernando Angulo
||| 12 ||   || align=left|  
|align=left|
|-align=center
|Loss|| 20-13-0 ||align=left| Herman Ngoudjo
||| 6,1:43 ||   || align=left|  
|align=left|
|-align=center
|Win|| 20-12-0 ||align=left| Moises Perez
||| 6 ||   || align=left|  
|align=left|
|-align=center
|Loss|| 19-12-0 ||align=left| Marcos Rene Maidana
||| 2,2:04 ||   || align=left|  
|align=left|
|-align=center
|Loss|| 19-11-0 ||align=left| Jose Reyes
||| 12 ||   || align=left|  
|align=left|
|-align=center
|Win|| 19-10-0 ||align=left| Mario Alberto Mondragon
||| 3,2:39 ||   || align=left|  
|align=left|
|-align=center
|Win|| 18-10-0 ||align=left| Alfredo Hernandez
||| 2,0:50 ||   || align=left|  
|align=left|
|-align=center
|Loss|| 17-10-0 ||align=left| Czar Amonsot
||| 10 ||   || align=left|  
|align=left|
|-align=center
|Win|| 17-9-0 ||align=left| Miguel Angel Huerta
||| 8 ||   || align=left|  
|align=left|
|-align=center
|Loss|| 16-9-0 ||align=left| David Díaz
||| 10 ||   || align=left|  
|align=left|
|-align=center
|Loss|| 16-8-0 ||align=left| Wes Ferguson
||| 8 ||   || align=left|  
|align=left|
|-align=center
|Win|| 16-7-0 ||align=left| Gerardo Valdez
||| 1 ||   || align=left|  
|align=left|
|-align=center
|Win|| 15-7-0 ||align=left| Daniel Seda
||| 10 ||   || align=left|  
|align=left|
|-align=center
|Win|| 14-7-0 ||align=left| Ricardo Dominguez
||| 8 ||   || align=left|  
|align=left|
|-align=center
|Loss|| 13-7-0 ||align=left| William Morelo
||| 5,3:00 ||   || align=left|  
|align=left|
|-align=center
|Loss|| 13-6-0 ||align=left| Eleazar Contreras Jr
||| 12 ||   || align=left|  
|align=left|
|-align=center
|Loss|| 13-5-0 ||align=left| José Luis Soto Karass
||| 8 ||   || align=left|  
|align=left|
|-align=center
|Loss|| 13-4-0 ||align=left| Mike Anchondo
||| 4,3:00 ||   || align=left|  
|align=left|
|-align=center
|Loss|| 13-3-0 ||align=left| Stevie Forbes
||| 10 ||   || align=left|  
|align=left|
|-align=center
|Loss|| 13-2-0 ||align=left| Jorge Páez
||| 7,2:44 ||   || align=left|  
|align=left|
|-align=center
|Win|| 13-1-0 ||align=left| Tomas Santos Serrano
||| 12 ||   || align=left|  
|align=left|
|-align=center
|Win|| 12-1-0 ||align=left| Luis Couoh
||| 12 ||   || align=left|  
|align=left|
|-align=center
|Win|| 11-1-0 ||align=left| Juan Carlos Chan
||| 3 ||   || align=left|  
|align=left|
|-align=center
|Win|| 10-1-0 ||align=left| Francisco Guillen
||| 8 ||   || align=left|  
|align=left|
|-align=center
|Win|| 9-1-0 ||align=left| Manuel Carballo
||| 10 ||   || align=left|  
|align=left|
|-align=center
|Win|| 8-1-0 ||align=left| Melvin Cepeda
||| 8 ||   || align=left|  
|align=left|
|-align=center
|Win|| 7-1-0 ||align=left| Ramon Perez
||| 8 ||   || align=left|  
|align=left|
|-align=center
|Win|| 6-1-0 ||align=left| Jose Luis Cob
||| 3 ||   || align=left|  
|align=left|
|-align=center
|Win|| 5-1-0 ||align=left| Luis Couoh
||| 8 ||   || align=left|  
|align=left|
|-align=center
|Loss|| 4-1-0 ||align=left| Manuel Estrella
||| 8 ||   || align=left|  
|align=left|
|-align=center
|Win|| 4-0-0 ||align=left| Samuel Lemus
||| 3 ||   || align=left|  
|align=left|
|-align=center
|Win|| 2-0-0 ||align=left| Luis Couoh
||| 3 ||   || align=left|  
|align=left|
|-align=center
|Win|| 1-0-0 ||align=left| Manuel Montero
||| 1 ||   || align=left|  
|align=left|

References

External links

Boxers from Yucatán (state)
Light-welterweight boxers
1987 births
Living people
Mexican male boxers